Snowshoe Lake is a lake in Thunder Bay District, Ontario, Canada, and part of the Lake Superior drainage basin. The primary inflow is an unnamed creek from Camel Read Lake, and primary outflow is an unnamed creek to Wabinosh Bay on Lake Nipigon (just  from the mouth of the Wabinosh River) which flows via the Nipigon River into Lake Superior.

References

Lakes of Thunder Bay District